Saeukkang (also called Shrimp Cracker) is a popular Korean snack produced by South Korean company Nongshim since 1971. Saeukkang has ranked as the highest-selling snack in South Korea for more than 30 years and is exported to 76 countries worldwide. Around four to five shrimps are used in each standard package (90g), and the parching method is used to make Saeukkang.

History

Name 
'Saeu' means shrimp in Korean. When Nongshim President Shin Choon-ho was looking for an appropriate name for the shrimp snack, he got an idea from his daughter, who at the time incorrectly sang the Korean folk song Arirang, pronouncing it 'Arikkang'.

Development 
Nongshim presented Saeukkang, the first snack in South Korea. The company got ideas from the popular Japanese snack Kappa Ebisen made by Calbee. After reverse engineering for more than a year, as the company had to find the appropriate temperature to bring suitable strength, the company ended up burning lots of mixture of flours and shrimps. Around 360 tons of flours were used.

Sales 
With the slogan We make our foods using our technology, Saeukkang was highly successful after its release, which significantly helped Nongshim to grow from low market share and profits. Many trucks around Korea were gathered with deposits in front of Nongshim's factory in Daebang-dong to buy Saeukkang. After three months of the initial release, Saeukkang contributed to increasing Nongshim's sales by 350%. With the help of Saeukkang's success, Nongshim was able to release other successful snacks: Banana Kick in 1978, Honey Twist Snack in 1979, Potato Chip in 1980. As of 2013, Saeukkang's sales went beyond 7.5 billion packages. Saeukkang can now be found in 76 countries and stores like Walmart in the United States and Taobao in China.

Variants 
Nongshim produces different variants of Saeukkang. Other than the standard package (90g), the company introduced different sizes of Saeukkang:
 Mini Saeukkang (30g)
 Deluxe Saeukkang (400g).

Nongshim also offers Saeukkang with different flavors:
 Spicy Saeukkang
 Rice Saeukkang
 Sweet & Sour Chicken Saeukkang

Marketing

TV CF 
Lee Jong-suk, Korean actor and model advertises Saeukkang .

Nongshim uses the slogan "손이 가요~ 손이 가~새우깡에 손이 가요; translation: Grab some here, grab some there. Grab shrimp crackers anywhere" since the initial release of Saeukkang. The slogan is highly successful that it still has been used in Nongshim's Saeukkang advertisement today.

Fan Clubs 
There are about 100 Saeukkang fan clubs in Korea's largest portal, NAVER. These communities share the interests of Saeukkang, consisting of both younger and older generations.

Criticism 

 In 2005, Criticism rose as the snack's shape and packaging looked similar to Japanese snack Kappa Ebisen.
 In 2008, there was a report from a consumer that a mouse's head was found in one of Saeukkang's packaging. However, Nongshim not only concealed the report for a month before formal investigation from the Ministry of Food and Drug Safety in Korea(MFDS) began, but also the company did not recall their product. MFDS did research the actual conditions of product productions of Nongshim's factories in Busan and Qingdao, but MFDS failed to find a connection of mouse's head into Saeukkang.
 In 2010, rice worms were found in Saeukkang, and MFDS draw a conclusion that rice worms were not from product productions, but they were from processes of distribution to retail stores.
 In 2019, Nongshim initially planned to stop using shrimps from Gunsan, South Korea for the production of Saeukkang due to sea pollution in Korea. As the company has been using shrimps from the United States and South Korea equally, the company claimed that the Gunsan's shrimp quality got worse unlike 48 years ago. However, from continuous protests and complaints from Gunsan fishermen and congress, Nongshim decided to use 10% of Gunsan shrimp with the condition of high-quality maintenance.

See also 
 Nongshim

 Snack

 Prawn Cracker

 Kappa Ebisen

External links 
 Nongshim Saeukkang's Official Website (EN)

References 

Snack foods
Korean snack food